Asad Qeshlaqi-ye Do (also Romanized as Asad Qeshlāqī-ye Do) is a village in Aslan Duz Rural District, Aslan Duz District, Parsabad County, Ardabil Province, Iran. At the 2006 census, its population was 78, in 11 families.

References 

Towns and villages in Parsabad County